Brazillia R. Kreep  (also known as The Kreep) is a Gothic poet, playwright, composer, lyricist, and illustrator in the tradition of Edward Gorey, and is the pen name of writer R. O’Donnell.

Premise and background

Static Multimedia
The Kreep first appeared on Halloween, 2007 as a weekly column published by webzine Static Multimedia. The column, under the banner of Kreep's Korner, reviewed classic and contemporary horror films in rhyme which were also linked to a weekly podcast on iTunes, voiced by creator O'Donnell and engineered by Eric Hoffhines. Formatted to resemble a penned letter to its readers, Kreep's Korner included historical facts and an original poem about the film with the reoccurring sign-off of "In Eternity".

Blogging and poetry
In 2008, O'Donnell began blogging regularly under "The Kreep" banner. Gothic poems in verse dubbed "Kreeplets" appeared almost daily, illustrated with original art, and covered a variety of macabre topics such as vampires, ghouls, and goblins. Other topics outside the sphere of horror included homelessness, love, war, and poverty. Additional blogs began reposting The Kreep such as In Shadows, Dirty Wings, and Gothican on a regular basis.

Also in 2008, The Kreep was featured on the NeverEndingWonder Halloween Radio's Voices of Halloween - a series of Halloween memories, greetings and station IDs by some of the most infamous names in the horror business.  Along with Forrest J. Ackerman (editor Famous Monsters of Filmland magazine), Vic Mizzy (composer The Addams Family, The Night Walker), and David Hedison (1958, actor, The Fly), The Kreep offered anecdotes about his meetings with Vincent Price and how Freddy Krueger actor Robert Englund celebrated Halloween.

Kreepmas and Jack Frost Day
The Kreep also celebrates several faux holidays such as Kreepmas and Jack Frost Day, which are celebrated yearly in poems and original art.

Kreepmas combines Halloween and Christmas, and is celebrated October 1 through December 31. Jack Frost Day is celebrated through the month of December and was originally conceived as a way for O'Donnell, due to a separation, to celebrate the holidays with his three children.

Poetry Readings

Poetry Scream
O'Donnell went on to create and host (as The Kreep) the Poetry Scream on July 30. 2010 at the Boiler Room located in the heart of Port Townsend, Washington. Dressed in steampunk garb, Brazillia R. Kreep reads from his book of Kreeplets, which concern the sinister escapades of doomed Children. Now an ongoing event, the Poetry Scream features five poets on stage at selected venues throughout the country.

Cabarets and musical comedies

Black Pearl Cabaret, Port Townsend, Wash.
The Kreep is playwright in residence of the Black Pearl Cabaret, a professional troupe of actors, variety artists, and musicians. They perform only original works of a Gothic, humorous and macabre nature. Originally located in the Victorian seaport of Port Townsend, WA., they are a traveling variety theatre.

An Evening With The Kreep
An Evening With The Kreep is a 60-minute theatrical with book, music, and lyrics by Brazillia R. Kreep. It was presented by the Black Pearl Cabaret on October 25–27, at the Undertown, located in the heart of the Victorian Seaport of Port Townsend, Washington. The "Kreep" show features poetry and song and summons a variety of haunting characters from the Kreep's darkest dreams. Characters included The Kreep performed by R O'Donnell, Parthenia Goste performed by Alanna Dailey, Jack Frost performed by Jason Altamirano, Ms. Autumn performed by Holly Stone-Cabe, and Kreepy H. Krawler performed by cellist Aidan McClave.

Songs included Welcome To My Lighthouse, See Me, Wish Myself, I'm Lamenting, and Halloween. The production was produced by O'Donnell and directed by Amanda Steurer.

Kreepmas
Kreepmas is a Gothic, macabre twist on the Charles Dickens’ classic A Christmas Carol with book, music, and lyrics by B. R. Kreep. It was presented by the Black Pearl Cabaret on December 20–23, 2012 at the Undertown in Port Townsend, WA. Characters included The Kreep performed by R O'Donnell, Albert T. Krumb performed by Jason "Ares" Altamirano, Kreepy H. Krawler performed by cellist Aidan McClave, Thaddeus Plum performed by Joey Ripely, Matilda Pift performed by Misha Cassella-blackburn and the two-headed Twipple Twins, Twinkle & Dinkle, performed by Cassella-blackburn and Ripley. Cellist arrangements were by Aidan McClave, costumes design by O'Donnell and built by Mara Palmen, and stage managed by D. J. Adams.

Songs included Kreepmas Celebration, Drink Up For Kreepmas, I'm the Ghost of Been There Done That, The Bells, Why Not For Me, and We Wish You a Merry Kreepmas. The production was produced and directed by Richard O'Donnell.

Kreepshow
Kreepshow is a 90-minute Gothic musical comedy cabaret with book, music, and lyrics by B. R. Kreep. It opened for an open-ended run on March 29, 2013 at the historic Manresa Castle in Port Townsend, WA. Characters include The Kreep performed by R O'Donnell, Parthenia Goste performed by Misha Cassella-Blackburn, Jack Frost performed by Jason Altamirano, and Kreepy H. Krawler performed by cellist Aidan McClave.

Songs include Welcome to My Castle, See Me, How I Miss the Circus, I'm Lamenting, and Kreepy Things. The production was produced and directed by O’Donnell, costumes and props by Lynne Cassella-blackburn, and stage managed by D. J. Adams.

Steve Treacy, contributing theatre critic to the Port Townsend Leader wrote of the troupe's skills that, “Overall the group’s singing and dancing numbers, including “I’m Lamenting” and “Creepy Things,” round out one's “good to be alive” evening.” He went on to praise The Kreep, saying, “His writing, directing, acting and warbling abilities conspire to make him a quadruple threat. Even his spoken poems, especially “Little Annie Orkle,” are sparkling (no mean feat for that musty old art form).”

In a “Best Local Theater of 2013” article published in the PT Leader Arts Section, "Kreepshow," a Gothic comedy cabaret conjuring some spiritual denizens of our Victorian seaport,” was listed as one of the favorite locally written plays penned by B. R. Kreep.  Other nods included one of the standout acting performances by Richard O’Donnell as The Kreep, as well as outstanding achievements in directing and choreography (O’Donnell) and costuming (Lynne Casella-Blackburn.)

St. John's Conservatory Theater, Ogdensburg, N.Y.
The Kreep was playwright in residence for the St. John's Conservatory Theater. SJCT's theatrical genres include musical theatre, satire, interactive theatre, improvisational theatre, variety show, circus, and vaudeville. St. John’s Conservatory Theater incorporates these genres in all-original musical comedies based on literature, folklore, and legend. Their production and costume design are "reminiscent of Tim Burton’s Gothic ingenuity."

Alice Isn't All There
Alice Isn't All There is a musical comedy adaptation on the Lewis Carroll’s classic Alice's Adventures in Wonderland with book, music, and lyrics by B. R. Kreep. It was presented by the St. John's Conservatory Theater on October 10, 11, 17, 18, 24, 25, 2014 at the St. John's Parish Theater in the city of Ogdensburg, NY. It was produced and directed by R O'Donnell.

The story of Alice's Adventures in Wonderland is told by the Bells & Wheezle Circus Company, a European-style commedia dell’arte and runs 90 minutes. A contemporary Alice finds herself in Wonderland haunted by the Victorian Alice while interacting with all the usual classic characters.

Original songs included The Bells & Wheezle Circus, Tic Toc, Wish Myself, We're All Mad Here, Not For Me, The Oswegatchie, All Hail the Queen/Off with His Head, and Reflections.

Alice Isn't All There Re-staged
Alice Isn't All There was re-staged and presented by St. John's Conservatory Theater on June 3, 4, 5, 17, 18, and 19, 2016 with an extended book, music, and lyrics accredited to playwright and composer B. R. Kreep (a.k.a. Richard O'Donnell).

The story of Alice Isn't All There concerns a steampunk-style Bells & Wheezle Circus Company, who set up their tent alongside the St. Lawrence River. There, under the big top, they perform their version of the famous story Alice's Adventures In Wonderland. After plucking their contemporary Alice from the audience, she finds herself in a Wonderland of trouble, haunted by the original Victorian Alice while interacting with all the classic characters.

Songs included The Bells & Wheezle Circus, I'm a Zizzlebot, I'm Late, Tic Toc, Wish Myself, We're All Mad Here, Why Not For Me, All Hail the Queen/Off with His Head, and Many Reflections.

Principal creative staff included executive producer and director Richard O’Donnell.

A Kreepy Christmas Carol
A Kreepy Christmas Carol is a 90-minute musical comedy adaptation on the Charles Dickens’ classic A Christmas Carol with book, music, and lyrics accredited to Richard O'Donnell's pen name B. R. Kreep. It was presented by the St. John's Conservatory Theater on December 6, 12, 13, 19 and 20, 2014 at the St. John's Parish Theater in the city of Ogdensburg, NY. It was produced, directed by Richard O'Donnell who played the title role.

Original songs included Kreepy Overture, Counting Silver, I'm So Happy, To Be A Zombie, Ghost of Been There Done That, Heed Our Warning, Ballad of Ebenezer Scrooge, I Hear The Bells A Ringing, and Wish.

A Kreepy Christmas Carol Re-named, Re-staged

Mr. Scrooge, a musical comedy adaptation on the Charles Dickens’ classic “A Christmas Carol" with book, music, and lyrics accredited to O'Donnell's pen name B. R. Kreep, was a re-staging of the musical A Kreepy Christmas Carol. It was originally produced at the St. John's Parish Hall Theater for the past three years, and was presented December 15, 2018 at the multimillion-dollar all-digital George Hall Theater at Ogdensburg Free Academy, Ogdensburg, NY. With the added lights, fly system, and sound capabilities, the production had a real “Broadway” feel. The upgraded theater experience included comfortable seating, and improved visibility. It played evenings December 15 and 16 with matinees December 16 and 17.

Mr. Scrooge was presented with additional songs and characters, and was executive produced and directed by O'Donnell.

Additional score included Mr. Scrooge Overture, Counting Silver/I'm So Happy, Uncle Scrooge, To Be a Zombie, Ghost of Been There Done That, Heed Our Warning, I Hear The Bells A Ringing, Lovely Love, A Christmas Carol and Wish.

It featured O’Donnell as Mr. Ebeneezer Scrooge.

Kreepy Hallow
Kreepy Hallow is a musical comedy adaptation of Washington Irving’s classic short story “The Legend of Sleepy Hollow" with book, music, and lyrics by Brazillia R. Kreep a.k.a. R. O’Donnell. It was presented by the St. John's Conservatory Theatre on October 16, 17, 18, 23, 24 and 25, 2016 at the St. John's Parish House in the city of Ogdensburg, NY. It as produced and direction by R. O'Donnell.

Story synopsis: Kreepy Hallow is set in the 1860s along the St. Lawrence River, when the first appointed female teacher, Miss Ichaboda Krane, takes over the ghostly schoolroom built on-top of a sacred Iroquois burial ground. With a classroom filled with eclectic children, her “eye” on Bartholomeus Van Tassel, a few unexpected guests, and a jealous local woman Electra Van Brunt watching her every move, Miss Ichaboda Krane's Halloween celebration turns into a most haunting affair. Narrated by Brazillia R. Kreep, Kreepy Hallow tells the tale of Ichaboda Krane's encounter with all things that go bump in the night as the dreadful Headless Horseman rides again.

Original songs included Halloween, Welcome to my Lighthouse, See Me, Kreepy Hallow, Proper Peace of Mind, Ballad of the Headless Horseman, I'm Lamenting, Ode to Wealth, and A Horseman. Additional period music included Shall We Gather at the River by Robert Lowry, Battle Hymn of the Republic, lyrics by Julia Ward Howe, music by William Steffe, and The Funeral March of a Marionette (Marche funèbre d'une marionnette) by Charles Gounod.

Kreepy Hallow Re-staged, Re-named

“Kreepy Hollow”, (with new spelling) was re-staged at the new 900-seat multimillion-dollar all-digital OFA Auditorium Theater in Ogdensburg, NY. It played October 26–28, 2017.

O’Donnell was the narrator Diedrich Knickerbocker.

Additional creative staff included producer and director O’Donnell, costume and makeup designer Karen Fischbeck with additional costumes by Heron Hetzler, Sound Design by Richard Patton, Lighting Design by Barry Pratt.

Twist

Twist is a musical comedy adaptation of Charles Dickens’ classic Oliver Twist with book, music, and lyrics penned under O’Donnell’s pen name B. R. Kreep. It was presented by the St. John's Conservatory Theater on October 14, 15, 16, 21, 22 and 23, 2016 at the St. John's Theatre in the city of Ogdensburg, NY. The production was executive produced and directed by O'Donnell.

Richard O’Donnell was also featured in the role of Fagin.

Honors

Coraline Handmade Box
In 2008, The Kreep received a Coraline handmade box numbered 46/50 assembled by the stop-motion animation team at Laika films, honoring their favorite bloggers. Inside the box, numbered 46/50, are decorated secret compartments that contain relics from the film including a bat/dog model, a bat body mold, authentic skeleton key with secret password, and a wing skeleton prototype #3. An old envelope with a wax seal with inlaid black button (as used for the eyes of the witch) and a hand-typed note explained the curious gift: "We admire your dedication to The Kreep. Please keep up the super work. We'll be reading."

References

External links
 B. R. Kreep
 St. John's Conservatory Theater
 Black Pearl Cabaret

Pseudonymous artists
American illustrators
Writers who illustrated their own writing
American male poets
American horror writers
Fictional undead
Fictional vampire types
Gothic fiction
American musical theatre librettists
American musical theatre lyricists
American musical theatre composers
American male songwriters
20th-century American dramatists and playwrights
20th-century pseudonymous writers